Peter Rowsthorn may refer to:

Peter Rowsthorn (actor) (born 1963), actor and comedian
Peter Rowsthorn (businessman), Australian businessman